Gammarus roeseli is a species of freshwater amphipod native to Europe.

Description 
Gammarus roeseli adult males reach a length of up to 22 mm; females are smaller than males. The species is distinct from many other common amphipods due to the spines on its fifth through seventh pereiopods. The color of G. roeseli individuals can vary from green to brown, gray, or yellow, and some have reddish markings on parts of their carapaces.

Distribution 
Gammarus roeseli originated in the Balkan area of Europe, and appears to have populated the Pannonian Basin as a glacial refuge before expanding into central and western Europe 10,000 years ago. It is now widespread across continental Europe. Having been in France since at least the mid-1800s it is considered to be a well-established non-native species in central, northern, and western Europe. However, it continues to expand its distribution range, including into new river basins in Italy in the 2010s. Even within the same geographic area – for example in France – some refer to the species as being invasive while others refer to it as being naturalized.

Ecology

Habitat 
Gammarus roeseli are found in freshwater environments such as ponds, lakes and streams. They are more abundant at warmer temperatures compared to some co-occurring amphipod species. Populations tend to be highest in rivers with moderate water flow and ample plants to be used as shelter.

Trophic interactions 
Gammarus roeseli are omnivores. Although they consume animal prey, their mouthparts are morphologically better adapted for consuming detritus and suspended particles, and for scraping algae and fungi off of detrital material and other surfaces.

Gammarus roeseli are predated on by fish. The distinctive spines of G. roeseli were found in a laboratory experiment to be associated with defense against predation by brown trout.

Like other gammaridean amphipods, G. roeseli serve as hosts for microsporidian parasites. The parasites have a variety of effects on infected G. roeseli. Physiologically, infection can increase salinity tolerance. Infection by some microsporidians can feminize male embryos and lead to female-biased sex ratios. Infection status also alters predator-avoidance behavior in G. roeseli.

Life history 
Males and females form precopulatory mating pairs; after mating, females carry eggs in a brood pouch and then release juveniles. Clutch size is variable, reaching up to 80 or more eggs for some females; clutch sizes are smaller, but eggs are larger, in the winter than during warmer months. Development in the brood pouch can take anywhere from 10 to over 200 days depending on water temperature, and survival of embryos is highest between 10 and 16 °C. Femals can produce up to eight broods over their lifetimes. Juveniles moult nine or ten times before reaching sexual maturity.

Traits associated with range expansion 
Gammarus roeseli are a successful invasive species due to their high reproductive rate, tolerance to changing environmental conditions and unique anti-predation characteristics. G. roeseli's mechanism of invasion is still unknown but it is most likely due to human activities such as aquaculture or fish repopulation. G. roeseli were once used as a food source in commercial fisheries, so it is possible that some individuals escaped and were able to populate new areas. G. roeseli have the ability to easily attach their bodies to substrates by using the spines on its metasomes. These organisms are also able to survive out of water for several days at a time, making the transfer of G. roeseli feasible over land.

Sensitivity to environmental impacts 
A number of studies have investigated the effects of toxins and pollutants on G. roeseli. In the 1980s, the insecticides Dyfonate and Ditrifon (which has since been banned in the European Union, India, and other countries) were found to be toxic to G. roeseli. More recently, investigations about imidacloprid, another insecticide, indicated sublethal effects on G. roeseli at environmentally-relevant levels, including effects on reproductive females. Silver nanoparticles have been found to reduce the feeding rate of G. roeseli. The sensitivity of G. roeseli to different stressors may also be affected by infection of microsporidian parasites. For example, infected females were found to be more strongly affected by exposure to cadmium.

References

Freshwater crustaceans of Europe
roeselii
Crustaceans described in 1835